This is a list of state leaders in the 10th century (901–1000) AD, except for the many leaders within the Holy Roman Empire.

Africa

Africa: East

Ethiopia

Zagwe dynasty of Ethiopia (complete list) –
Mara Takla Haymanot, Negus (10th century)
Tatadim, Negus (10th century)

Africa: Northeast

Egypt
Tulunids (complete list) –
Harun, Amir (896–904)
Shayban, Amir (904–905)

Fatimid Caliphate (complete list) –
Al-Mu'izz li-Din Allah, Caliph (953–975, transfer from Ifriqiya in 973)
al-Aziz Billah, Caliph (975–996)
al-Hakim bi-Amr Allah, Caliph (996–1021)

Sudan

Makuria (complete list) –
Georgios I, King (late 9th–early 10th century)
Zakharias IV, King (920–930)
Kabil, King (c.943)
Georgios II, King (969–c.1002)
Raphael, King (1000–c.1006)

Africa: Northcentral

Ifriqiya

Rustamid dynasty (complete list) –
Yusuf Abu Hatim ibn Muhammad Abi l-Yaqzan, Imam (894–895, 899–906) 
Yaqzan ibn Muhammad Abi l-Yaqzan, Imam (906–909)

Aghlabid dynasty (complete list) –
Abu Ishaq Ibrahim II ibn Ahmad, Emir (875–902)
Abu 'l-Abbas Abdallah II ibn Ibrahim, Emir (902–903)
Abu Mudhar Ziyadat Allah III ibn Abdallah, Emir (903–909)

Fatimid Caliphate (complete list) –
Abdullah al-Mahdi Billah, Caliph (909–934)
Al-Qa'im bi-Amr Allah, Caliph (934–946)
Al-Mansur bi-Nasr Allah, Caliph (946–953)
Al-Mu'izz li-Din Allah, Caliph (953–975, transfer to Egypt in 973)

Zirid dynasty (complete list) –
Buluggin ibn Ziri, ruler (973–983)
al-Mansur ibn Buluggin, ruler (983–995)
Badis ibn Mansur, ruler (995–1016)

Africa: Northwest

Barghawata (complete list) –
Abu Ghafir Muhammad, King (c.888–917)
Abu al-Ansar Abdullah, King (c.917–961)
Abu Mansur Isa, King (c.961-?)

Idrisid dynasty of Morocco (complete list) –
Yahya ibn al-Qasim, Emir (unknown–905)
Yahya ibn Idris, Emir (905–922)
Al-Hasan ibn Muhammad, Emir (928–930)
Al-Qasim ibn Muhammad, Emir (937–949)
Abu'l-Aysh ibn al-Qasim Jannun, Emir (949–952)
Al-Hasan ibn al-Qasim Jannun, Emir (952–974)

Emirate of Nekor (complete list) –
Sa'id II ibn Salih, Emir (864–916)
Salih III ibn Sa'id, Emir (917–927)
Abd al-Badi' ibn Salih, Emir (927–929)
Abu Ayyub Isma'il ibn Abd al Malik, Emir (c.930–935)
Musa ibn Rumi, Emir (c.936–940)
Abd as-Sami' ibn Jurthum, Emir (940–947)
Jurthum ibn Ahmad, Emir (947–970)

Africa: West

Nigeria

Kingdom of Kano (complete list) –
Bagauda, King (999–1063)

Kingdom of Nri (complete list) –
Eri, King (948–1041)

Americas

Americas: Mesoamerica

Maya civilization

Calakmul (complete list) –
Aj Took', King (c.909)

Asia

Asia: Central

Afghanistan

Ghaznavid dynasty (complete list) –
Sabuktigin, Emir (977–997)
Ismail, Emir (997–998)
Mahmud, Emir (998–1002), Sultan (1002–1030)

Uzbekistan

Samanid Empire (complete list) –
Isma'il ibn Ahmad, Amir (892–907)
Ahmad Samani, Amir (907–914)
Nasr II, Amir (914–943)
Nuh I, Amir (943–954)
Ibrahim ibn Ahmad, Amir (947)
Abd al-Malik I, Amir (954–961)
Mansur I, Amir (961–976)
Nuh II, Amir (976–997)
Abd al-Aziz ibn Nuh, Amir (992)
Mansur II, Amir (997–999)
Abd al-Malik II, Amir (999)
Isma'il Muntasir, Amir (1000–1004)

Tibet

Guge
bKra shis mgon, King (fl.947)
Srong nge Ye shes 'Od, King (?–988 / 959–1036) 
Khor re, King (988–996)
Lha lde, King (996–1024)

Asia: East

China: Tang dynasty

Tang dynasty (complete list) –
Zhaozong, Emperor (888–904)
Ai, Emperor (904–907)

Khitan China: Liao dynasty

Liao dynasty (complete list) –
Abaoji, Emperor (907–926)
Taizong, Emperor (926–947)
Shizong, Emperor (947–951)
Muzong, Emperor (951–969)
Jingzong, Emperor (969–982)
Shengzong, Emperor (982–1031)

Northern China: The Five Dynasties

Later Liang (complete list) –
Zhu Wen, Emperor (907–912)
Zhu Yougui, Emperor (912–913)
Zhu Youzhen, Emperor (913–923)

Later Tang (complete list) –
Li Cunxu, Prince of Jin (908–923), Emperor of Later Tang (923–926)
Li Siyuan, Emperor (926–933)
Li Conghou, Emperor (933–934)
Li Congke, Emperor (934–937)

Later Jin (complete list) –
Shi Jingtang, Emperor (936–942)
Shi Chonggui, Emperor (942–947)

Later Han (complete list) –
Liu Zhiyuan, Emperor (947–948)
Liu Chengyou, Emperor (948–951)

Later Zhou (complete list) –
Guo Wei, Emperor (951–954)
Chai Rong, Emperor (954–959)
Guo Zongxun, Emperor (959–960)

Southern China: The Ten Kingdoms

Wu (complete list) –
Yang Xingmi, Emperor (904–905)
Yang Wo, Emperor (905–908)
Yang Longyan, Emperor (908–921)
Yang Pu, Emperor (921–937)

Former Shu (complete list) –
Wang Jian, Emperor (907–918)
Wang Zongyan, Duke (918–925)

Chu (complete list) –
Ma Yin, Prince (907–930)
Ma Xisheng, Prince (930–932)
Ma Xifan, Prince (932–947)
Ma Xiguang, Prince (947–950)
Ma Xi'e, Prince (950)
Ma Xichong, Prince (950–951)
Liu Yan, Prince (951–953)
Wang Kui, Prince (953–956)
Zhou Xingfeng, Prince (956–962)
Zhou Baoquan, Prince (962–963)

Wuyue (complete list) –
Qian Liu, King (907–932)
Qian Yuanguan, King (932–941)
Qian Hongzuo, King (941–947)
Qian Hongzong, King (947)
Qian Chu, King (947–978)

Min (complete list) –
Wang Chao, ruler (early 10th century)
Wang Shenzhi, Emperor (909–925)
Wang Yanhan, Emperor (925–926)
Wang Yanjun, Emperor (926–935)
Wang Jipeng, Emperor (935–939)
Wang Yanxi, Emperor (939–944)
Zhu Wenjin, Emperor (944–945)
Wang Yanzheng, Emperor (943–945)

Southern Han (complete list) –
Liu Yan, Emperor (917–941)
Liu Bin, Emperor (941–943)
Liu Sheng, Emperor (943–958)
Liu Chang, Emperor (958–971)

Jingnan (complete list) –
Gao Jixing, Prince (909–928)
Gao Conghui, Prince (928–948)
Gao Baorong, Prince (948–960)
Gao Baoxu, Prince (960–962)
Gao Jichong, Prince (962–963)

Later Shu (complete list) –
Meng Zhixiang, Emperor (934)
Meng Chang, Prince (934–965)

Southern Tang (complete list) –
Li Bian, Emperor (937–943)
Li Jing, Emperor (943–961)
Li Yu, Emperor (961–975)

Northern Han (complete list) –
Liu Chong, Emperor (951–954)
Liu Jun, Emperor (954–968)
Liu Ji'en, Emperor (968)
Liu Jiyuan, Emperor (968–979)

China: Northern Song

Song dynasty (complete list) –
Taizu, Emperor (960–976) 
Taizong, Emperor (976–997) 
Zhenzong, Emperor (997–1022)

China: Other states and entities

Dingnan Jiedushi (complete list) –
Li Sijian, Jiedushi (c.886–908)
Li Yichang, Jiedushi (908–909/910)
Li Renfu, Jiedushi (909/910–933)
Li Yichao, Jiedushi (933–935)
Li Yixing, Jiedushi (935–967)
Li Kerui, Jiedushi (967–978)
Li Jiyun, Jiedushi (978–980)
Li Jipeng, Jiedushi (980–982, 988–994)
Li Jiqian, Jiedushi (998–1004)

Qi –
Li Maozhen, Prince (901/907–924)

Qingyuan Jiedushi (complete list) –
Liu Congxiao, Jiedushi (949–962)
Liu Shaozi, Jiedushi (962)
Zhang Hansi, Jiedushi (962–963)
Chen Hongjin, Jiedushi (963–978)

Yan –
Liu Shouguang, Emperor (911–914)

Yiwu Circuit – 
Wang Chuzhi, Jiedushi (910–921)
Zhao (Chengde) –
Wang Rong, Prince (910–921)

Dali Kingdom (complete list) –
Duan Siping, Emperor (937–944)
Duan Siying, Emperor (944–945)
Duan Siliang, Emperor (945–951)
Duan Sicong, Emperor (952–968)
Duan Sushun, Emperor (968–985)
Duan Suying, Emperor (985–1009)

Japan

Heian period Japan (complete list) –
Daigo, Emperor (897–930)
Suzaku, Emperor (930–946)
Murakami, Emperor (946–967)
Reizei, Emperor (967–969)
En'yū, Emperor (969–984)
Kazan, Emperor (984–986)
Ichijō, Emperor (986–1011)

Korea

Balhae (complete list) –
Dae Wihae, King (894–906)
Dae Inseon, King (906–926)

Later Baekje –
Gyeon Hwon, King (892–935)
Gyeon Singeom, King (935–936)

Later Silla (complete list) –
Hyogong, King (897–912)
Sindeok, King (912–917)
Gyeongmyeong, King (917–924)
Gyeongae, King (924–927)
Gyeongsun, King (927–935)

Taebong –
Gung-ye, King (901–918)

Goryeo (complete list) –
Taejo, King (918–943)
Hyejong, King (943–945)
Jeongjong, King (945–949)
Gwangjong, King (949–975)
Gyeongjong, King (975–981)
Seongjong, King (981–997)
Mokjong, King (997–1009)

Asia: Southeast

Cambodia
Khmer Empire (complete list) –
Yasovarman I, King (889–910)
Harshavarman I, King (900–925)
Ishanavarman II, King (925–928)
Jayavarman IV, King (928–941)
Harshavarman II, King (941–944)
Rajendravarman II, King (944–968)
Jayavarman V, King (968–1001)

Indonesia
Indonesia: Java

Sunda Kingdom (complete list) –
Windusakti Prabu Dewageng, Maharaja (895–913)
Rakeyan Kemuning Gading Prabu Pucukwesi, Maharaja (913–916)
Rakeyan Jayagiri Prabu Wanayasa, Maharaja (916–942)
Prabu Resi Atmayadarma Hariwangsa, Maharaja (942–954)
Limbur Kancana, Maharaja (954–964)
Prabu Munding Ganawirya, Maharaja (964–973)
Prabu Jayagiri Rakeyan Wulung Gadung, Maharaja (973–989)
Prabu Brajawisesa, Maharaja (989–1012)

Mataram Kingdom (complete list) –
Shailendra dynasty/Sanjaya dynasty
Balitung, King (899–911)
Daksa, King (910–919)
Tulodong, King (919–924)
Wawa, King (924–929)
Isyana dynasty
Mpu Sindok, King (c.929–947)
Isyana Tunggawijaya Queen (947–c.985)
Makutawangsa Wardhana, King (c.985–991)
Dharmawangsa, King (991–1016)

Indonesia: Sumatra
Srivijaya: Shailendra dynasty –
Śri Udayadityavarman, King (c.960)
Haji, King (c.980)
Sri Cudamani Warmadewa, King (c.988)

Indonesia: Lesser Sunda Islands
Bali Kingdom: Warmadewa dynasty (complete list) –
Sri Kesari Warmadewa, King (fl.914)
Ugrasena, King (fl.915–942)
Tabanendrawarmadewa, King (fl.955–967)
Indrajayasingha Warmadewa, Co-regent (fl.960)
Janasadhu Warmadewa, King (fl.975)
Śri Wijaya Mahadewi, Queen (fl.983)
Mahendradatta, Queen (before 989–1007)

Malaysia: Peninsular
Kedah Sultanate (complete list) –
Darma Raja II, Maharaja (c.880–956)
Durbar II, Raja (c.956–1136)

Myanmar / Burma
Early Pagan Kingdom (complete list) –
Sale Ngahkwe, King (early 10th century)
Theinhko, King (early 10th century)
Nyaung-u Sawrahan, King (late 10th century)

Philippines

Tondo (complete list) –
Jayadewa, Admiral (c.900)

Rajahnate of Butuan (complete list) –
Datu Bantuan, Rajah (?–989)
Kiling, Rajah (989–1009)

Thailand
Ngoenyang (complete list) –
Lao Thoeng, King (early 10th century)
Lao Tueng, King (mid 10th century)
Lao Khon, King (late 10th century)

Vietnam

Champa (complete list) –
Jaya Sinhavarman I, King (c.898/903)
Jaya Saktivarman, King (?)
Bhadravarman II, King (fl. 910)
Indravarman III, King (c.918–959)
Jaya Indravarman I, King (959–c.965)
Paramesvaravarman I, King (c.965–982)
Indravarman IV, King (982–986)
Lieou Ki-Tsong, of Annam, King (c.986–989)
Harivarman II, King (c.989–997)
Yang Bo Zhan, of Fan, King (?)
Yang Pu Ku Vijaya, King (c.998–1007)

Khúc clan (complete list) –
Khúc Tiên Chủ, Jiedushi (905–907)
Khúc Trung Chủ, Jiedushi (907–917)
Khúc Hậu Chủ, Jiedushi (917–930)
Dương Đình Nghệ, Jiedushi (930–937)
Kiều Công Tiễn, Jiedushi (937–938)

Ngô dynasty (complete list) –
Ngô Quyền, King (938–944)
Dương Tam Kha, King (944–950)
Ngô Xương Ngập, Grand Prince (950–954)
Ngô Xương Văn, King (950–965)

Đại Việt: Đinh dynasty (complete list) –
Đinh Bộ Lĩnh, Emperor (968–979)
Đinh Phế Đế, Emperor (979–980)

Đại Việt: Early Lê dynasty (complete list) –
Lê Hoàn, Emperor (980–1005)

Asia: South

Afghanistan

Ghaznavids (complete list) –
Sabuktigin, Emir (977–997)
Ismail, Emir (997–998)
Mahmud, Sultan (998–1030)

Ghurid dynasty (complete list) –
Amir Suri, Malik (9th–10th century)

Bengal and Northeast India

Chandra dynasty –
Chamunda or Bhuyada, King (c.881–908)
Vairisimha, King (25 years?)
Ratnaditya, King (15 years?)
Gaghada, King (c.908–937)

Kamarupa: Pala dynasty –
Brahma Pala, King (900–920)
Ratna Pala, King (920–960)
Indra Pala, King (960–990)
Go Pala, King (990–1015)

Mallabhum (complete list) –
Yadav Malla, King (906–919)
Jagat Malla, King (994–1007)

Pala Empire (complete list) –
Narayanapala, King (9th–10th century)
Rajyapala, King (10th century)
Gopala II, King (10th century)
Vigrahapala II, King (10th century)
Mahipala I, King (977–1027)

Pala dynasty of Kamarupa (complete list) –
Brahma Pala, King (900–920)
Ratna Pala, King (920–960)
Indra Pala, King (960–990)
Go Pala, King (990–1015)

India

Amber Kingdom (complete list) –
Sorha Deva, King (966–1006)

Chahamanas of Naddula (complete list) –
Lakshmana, King (c.950–982)
Shobhita, King (c.982–986)
Baliraja, King (c.986–990)
Vigrahapala, King (c.990–994)
Mahindra, King (c.994–1015)

Chahamanas of Shakambhari (complete list) –
Vakpatiraja I, King (c.917–944)
Simharaja, King (c.944–971)
Vigraharaja II, King (c.971–998)
Durlabharaja II, King (c.998–1012)

Chandelas of Jejakabhukti (complete list) –
Rahila, King (c.885–905)
Shri Harsha, King (c.905–925)
Yasho-Varman, King (c.925–950)
Dhanga-Deva, King (c.950–999)
Ganda-Deva, King (c.999–1002)

Chaulukya dynasty of Gujarat (complete list) –
Mularaja, King (941–996)
Chamundaraja, King (996–1008)

Eastern Chalukyas (complete list) –
Chalukya Bhima I, King (892–921)
Vijayaditya IV, King (921)
Amma I, King (921–927)
Beta Vijayaditya V, King (927)
Tala I, King (927)
Vikramaditya II, King (927–928)
Bhima II, King (928)
Yuddhamalla II, King (928–935)
Chalukya Bhima II, King (935–947)
Amma II, King (947–970)
Tala I, King (970)
Danarnava, King (970–973)
Jata Choda Bhima, King (973–999)
Shaktivarman I, King (1000–1011)

Western Chalukya Empire (complete list) –
Tailapa II, King (957–997)
Satyashraya, King (997–1008)

Chera/Perumals of Makotai (complete list) –
Goda Ravi, King (c.883–913)
Kotha Kotha Kerala Kesari, King (c.913–c.943)
Indu Kotha, King (943–962)
Bhaskara Ravi Manukuladithya, King (962–1021)

Chola dynasty (complete list) –
Aditya I, King (870–907)
Parantaka I, King (907–950)
Gandaraditya, King (950–957)
Arinjaya, King (956–957)
Parantaka Chola II, King (957–970)
Uttama Chola, King (970–985)
Rajaraja I, King (c.985–1014)

Eastern Ganga dynasty (complete list) –
Gunamaharnava I, King (c.895–939)
Vajrahasta II (or Anangabhimadeva I), King (c.895–939)
Gundama, King (939–942)
Kamarnava I, King (942–977)
Vinayaditya, King (977–980)
Vajrahasta Aniyakabhima, King (980–1015)

Western Ganga dynasty (complete list) –
Rachamalla II, King (870–907) 
Ereganga Neetimarga II, King (907–921) 
Narasimha, King (921–933) 
Rachamalla III, King (933–938) 
Butuga II, King (938–961) 
Marulaganga Neetimarga, King (961–963) 
Marasimha II Satyavakya, King (963–975) 
Rachamalla IV Satyavakya, King (975–986) 
Rachamalla V, King (986–999) 
Rakkasa Ganga, King (985–1024)

Garhwal Kingdom (complete list) –
Bhakti Pal, King (895–919)
Jayachand Pal, King (920–948)
Prithvi Pal, King (949–971)
Medinisen Pal, King (973–995)
Agasti Pal, King (995–1014)

Gurjara-Pratihara dynasty (complete list) –
Mahendrapala I, King (885–910)
Bhoja II, King (910–913) 
Mahipala I, King (913–944)
Mahendrapala II, King (944–948)
Devapala, King (948–954)
Vinayakapala, King (954–955)
Mahipala II, King (955–956)
Vijayapala II, King (956–960) 
Rajapala, King (960–1018)

Kalachuris of Tripuri (complete list) –
Shankaragana II, King (890–910)
Balaharsha, King (910–915)
Yuvaraja-deva I, King (915–945)
Lakshmanaraja II, King (945–970)
Shankaragana III, King (970–980)
Yuvarajadeva II, King (980–990)
Kokalla II, King (990–1015)

Kumaon Kingdom: Katyuri (complete list) –
Nimbarta Dev, King (900–915)
Istanga, King (915–930)
Lalitasura Dev, King (930–955)
Bhu Dev, King (955–970)
Salonaditya, King (970–985)
Ichchhata Dev, King (985–1000)
Deshat Dev, King (1000–1015)

Pala dynasty of Kamarupa (complete list) –
Brahma Pala, King (900–920)
Ratna Pala, King (920–960)
Indra Pala, King (960–990)
Go Pala, King (990–1015)

Pandyan dynasty (complete list) –
Maravarman Rajasimha II, King (900–920)

Paramaras of Chandravati (complete list) –
Utpala-raja, King (c.910–930)
Arnno-raja, or Aranya-raja, King (c.930–950)
Krishna-raja, King (c.950–979)
Dhara-varaha or Dharani-varaha, King (c.970–990)
Dhurbhata, King (c.990–1000)

Paramara dynasty of Malwa (complete list) –
Vakpati I, King (9th–10th century)
Vairisimha II, King (10th century)
Siyaka II, King (948–972)
Vakpati II, King (972–990s)
Sindhuraja, King (990s–1010)

Rashtrakuta dynasty (complete list) –
Krishna II, King (878–914)
Indra III, King (914–929)
Amoghavarsha II, King (929–930)
Govinda IV, King (930–936)
Amoghavarsha III, King (936–939)
Krishna III, King (939–967)
Khottiga Amoghavarsha, King (967–972)
Karka II, King (972–973)
Indra IV, King (973–982)

Pakistan

Hindu Shahi (complete list) –
Jayapala, King (964–1001)

Sri Lanka

Anuradhapura Kingdom, Sri Lanka (complete list) –
Sena II, King (866–901)
Udaya I, King (901–912)
Kassapa IV, King (912–929)
Kassapa V, King (929–939)
Dappula IV, King (939–940)
Dappula V, King (940–952)
Udaya II, King (952–955)
Sena III, King (955–964)
Udaya III, King (964–972)
Sena IV, King (972–975)
Mahinda IV, King (975–991)
Sena V, King (991–1001)

Asia: West

Mesopotamia

Abbasid Caliphate, Baghdad (complete list) –
al-Mu'tadid, Caliph (892–902)
al-Muktafi, Caliph (902–908)
al-Muqtadir, Caliph (908–929, 929–932)
al-Qahir, Caliph (929, 932–934)
al-Radi, Caliph (934–940)
al-Muttaqi, Caliph (940–944)
al-Mustakfi, Caliph (944–946)
al-Muti, Caliph (946–974)
at-Ta'i, Caliph (974–991)
al-Qadir, Caliph (991–1031)

Hamdanid dynasty (complete list) –
Emirate of Mosul
Nasir al-Dawla, Emir (929–967)
Abu Taghlib, Emir (967–978)
Abu Tahir Ibrahim and Abu Abdallah al-Husayn (989–990)
Emirate of Aleppo
Sayf al-Dawla, Emir (945–967)
Sa'd al-Dawla, Emir (967–991)
Sa'id al-Dawla, Emir (991–1002)

Persia

Buyid Empire (complete list) –
Buyids in Fars
Imad al-Dawla, Emir (934–949)
'Adud al-Dawla, Emir (949–983)
Sharaf al-Dawla, Emir (983–989)
Samsam al-Dawla, Emir (989–998)
Baha' al-Dawla, Emir (998–1012)
Sultan al-Dawla, Emir (1012–1024)

Buyids in Ray
Rukn al-Dawla, Emir (935–976)
Fakhr al-Dawla, Emir (976–980, 984–997)
Mu'ayyad al-Dawla, Emir (980–983)
Majd al-Dawla, Emir (997–1029)

Buyids in Iraq
Mu'izz al-Dawla, Emir (945–967)
'Izz al-Dawla, Emir (966–978)
'Adud al-Dawla, Emir (978–983)
Samsam al-Dawla, Emir (983–987)
Sharaf al-Dawla, Emir (987–989)
Baha' al-Dawla, Emir (989–1012)

Saffarid dynasty (complete list) –
Amr ibn al-Layth, Amir (879–901)
Tahir ibn Muhammad ibn Amr, Amir (901–908)
al-Layth ibn 'Ali, Amir (908–910)
Muhammad ibn Ali ibn al-Layth, Amir (910–911)
Al-Mu'addal, Amir (911)
Amr ibn Ya'qub, Amir (912–913)
Ahmad ibn Muhammad, Amir (922–963)
Khalaf ibn Ahmad, Amir (963–1002)

Samanid Empire (complete list) –
Isma'il ibn Ahmad, Amir (892–907)
Ahmad Samani, Amir (907–914)
Nasr II, Amir (914–943)
Nuh I, Amir (943–954)
Ibrahim ibn Ahmad, Amir (947)
Abd al-Malik I, Amir (954–961)
Mansur I, Amir (961–976)
Nuh II, Amir (976–997)
Abd al-Aziz ibn Nuh, Amir (992)
Mansur II, Amir (997–999)
Abd al-Malik II, Amir (999)
Isma'il Muntasir, Amir (1000–1004)

Ziyarid dynasty (complete list) –
Mardavij, Emir (930–935)
Vushmgir, Emir (935–967)
Bisutun, Emir (967–977)
Qabus, Emir (977–981)
Buyid, Emir occupation (977–997)
Qabus, Emir (997–1012)

Yemen

Yemeni Zaidi State (complete list) –
al-Hadi ila'l-Haqq Yahya, Imam (897–911)
al-Murtada Muhammad, Imam (911–913)
an-Nasir Ahmad, Imam (913–934 or 937)
al-Muntakhab al-Hasan, Imam (934–936 or 939)
al-Mukhtar al-Qasim, Imam (936–956)
al-Mansur Yahya, Imam (934–976)
ad-Da'i Yusuf, Imam (977–999)
al-Mansur al-Qasim al-Iyyani, Imam (999–1002)

Europe

Europe: Balkans

First Bulgarian Empire (complete list) –
Simeon I, Emperor (893–927)
Peter I, Emperor (927–969)
Boris II, Emperor (969–971)
Roman, Emperor (977–991)
Samuel, Khan (997–1014)

Byzantine Empire (complete list) –
Leo VI the Wise, Co-Emperor (870–886), Emperor (886–912)
Alexander, Emperor (912–913)
Constantine VII Porphyrogennetos, Junior Co-Emperor (908–913, 920–945), Emperor (913–920, 945–959)
Romanos I Lekapenos, Emperor (920–944)
Christopher Lekapenos, Junior Co-Emperor (921–931)
Stephen Lekapenos, Junior Co-Emperor (924–945)
Constantine Lekapenos, Junior Co-Emperor (924–945)
Romanos II, Emperor (959–963)
Nikephoros II Phokas, Emperor (963-969)
John I Tzimiskes, Emperor (969-976)
Basil II, Junior Co-Emperor (960–976), Emperor (976–1025)

Emirate of Crete (complete list) –
Muhammad ibn Shu'ayb al-Zarkun, Emir (c.895–910)
Yusuf ibn Umar ibn Shu'ayb, Emir (c.910–915)
Ali ibn Yusuf ibn Umar, Emir (c.915–925)
Ahmad ibn Umar, Emir (c.925–940)
Shu'ayb ibn Ahmad, Emir (940–943)
Ali ibn Ahmad, Emir (943–949)
Abd al-Aziz ibn Shu'ayb, Emir (949–961)

Duchy / Kingdom of Croatia (complete list) –
Muncimir, Duke (892–910)
Tomislav, Duke (910–925), King (c.925–928)
Trpimir II, King (928–935)
Krešimir I, King (935–945)
Miroslav, King (945–949)
Michael Krešimir II, King (949–969)
Stephen Držislav, King (969–997)
Svetoslav Suronja, King (997–1000)
Gojslav, co-King (1000–c.1020)

Principality of Serbia (complete list) –
Petar, Prince (892–917)
Pavle, Prince (917–921)
Zaharija, Prince (922–924)
Časlav, Prince (c.927–c.960)

Duklja (complete list) –
Petar, Archon (c.1000)
Jovan Vladimir, Prince (c.1000–1016)

Europe: British Isles

Great Britain: Scotland

Kingdom of Scotland/ Kingdom of Alba (complete list) –
Constantine II (III), King (900–943)
Malcolm I, King (943–954)
Indulf, King (954–962)
Dub, King (962–967)
Cuilén, King (967–971)
Kenneth II, King (971–995)
Amlaíb, rival King (973–977)
Constantine III (IV), King (995–997)
Kenneth III, King (997–1005)

Kingdom of Strathclyde (complete list) –
Dyfnwal (died 908×915)
Owain ap Dyfnwal (fl. 934)
Dyfnwal ab Owain (died 975)
Rhydderch ap Dyfnwal (fl. 971), possible King
Máel Coluim (died 997)
Owain ap Dyfnwal (died 1015), possible King

Kingdom of the Isles (complete list) –
Ragnall ua Ímair, King (c.914–921) to 921?
Gebeachan, King (?–937)
Maccus mac Arailt, King (fl.971–974)
Gofraid mac Arailt, King (?–989)
Gilli, Chieftain (990–?)

Great Britain: Northumbria

Kingdom of Northumbria (complete list) –
Cnut, King (c.900)
Æthelwold, King (900–902)
Airdeconut, King (c.902)
Eowils, co-King (902–910)
Halfdan II, co-King (902–910)
Ingwær, co-King (?–910)
Ragnall ua Ímair, King (918–921)
Sitric Cáech, King (921–927)
Gofraid ua Ímair, King (927)
Olaf Guthfrithson, King (939–941)
Sitric II, King (c.942)
Ragnall Guthfrithson, King (943–944)
Eric Bloodaxe, King (947–948, 952–954)
Amlaíb Cuarán, King (949–952)

Great Britain: England

The Britons (complete list) –
Anarawd ap Rhodri, King (878–916)
Idwal Foel, King (916–942)
Hywel Dda, King (942–950)
Dyfnwal ab Owain, King (962–975)
Maredudd ab Owain, King (986–999)

Kingdom of East Anglia (complete list) –
Eohric, King (890–902)
Æthelwold, Sub-King (902)
Guthrum II, King (902–918)

Mercia (complete list) –
Æthelred II, Lord (c.881–911)
Æthelflæd, Lady (911–918)
Ælfwynn, Lady (918)

Kingdom of Wessex / Kingdom of England (complete list) –
Edward the Elder, King of Wessex (899–924)
Ælfweard, King of Wessex (924)
Æthelstan, King of the Anglo-Saxons (924–927), King of the English (927–939)
Edmund I, King (939–946)
Eadred, King (946–955)
Eadwig, King (955–959)
Edgar, King (959–975)
Edward the Martyr, King (975–978)
Æthelred the Unready, King (978–1013, 1014–1016)

Great Britain: Wales

Glywysing and Morgannwg (complete list) –
Arthfael Hen ap Rhys, King of Glywysing (785–c.825)
Rhys ap Arthfael, King of Glywysing (c.830–c.840)
Hywel ap Rhys, King of Glywysing (c.840–886)
Owain ap Hywel, King of Glywysing (886–c.930) 
Gruffydd ab Owain, King of Glywysing (c.930–934)
Cadwgan ab Owain, King of Glywysing (c.930–950)
Morgan Hen ab Owain, the Old, King of Morgannwg (c.942–974)
Owain ap Morgan, King of Glywysing (974–c.983) 
Rhys ab Owain, King of Glywysing (c.990–c.1000)
Ithel the Black, King of Glywysing (990)
Iestyn ab Owain, King of Glywysing (c.990–c.1015)

Kingdom of Gwynedd (complete list) –
Anarawd ap Rhodri, King (878–916)
Idwal Foel, King (916–942)
Hywel Dda, King (942–950) 
Iago ab Idwal, King (950–979)
Ieuaf ab Idwal, King (950–969)
Hywel ab Ieuaf, King (974–985)
Cadwallon ab Ieuaf, King (985–986)
Maredudd ab Owain, King (986–999)
Cynan ap Hywel, King (999–1005)

Gwent (complete list) –
Brochfael ap Meurig, King (880–920)
Arthfael ap Hywel, King (?–916/927)
Owain ap Hywel, King (920–930)
Gruffydd ab Owain, King (?–c.935)
Cadwgan ab Owain, King (?–951)
Nowy ap Gwriad, King (c.950–c.970)
Arthfael ap Nowy, King (c.970–983)
Rhodri ap Elisedd and Gruffydd ap Elisedd, co-Kings (983–c.1015)

Kingdom of Powys (complete list) –
Llywelyn ap Merfyn, King (900–942)
Hywel Dda, King (942–950)
Owain ap Hywel Dda, King (950–986)
Maredudd ap Owain, King (986–999)
Llywelyn ap Seisyll, King (999–1023)

Kingdom of Dyfed (complete list) –
Llywarch ap Hyfaidd, King (893–904)
Rhodri ap Hyfaidd, King (904–905)
Hywel Dda, King (905–909)

Seisyllwg (complete list) –
Cadell ap Rhodri (878–909)

Deheubarth (complete list) –
Hywel Dda, King (920–950)
Owain ap Hywel, King (950–986) 
Rhodri ap Hywel, King (950–953)
Edwin ap Hywel, King (950–954)
Maredudd ab Owain, King (986–999)
Cynan ap Hywel, prince of Gwynedd (999–1005)
Hywel ab Owain, King (c.990–c.1043)

Ireland

Ireland (complete list) –
Flann Sinna, High King (877–914)
Niall Glúndub, High King (915–917)
Donnchad Donn, High King (918–942)
Congalach Cnogba, High King ( 943–954)
Domnall ua Néill, High King (955–978)
Máel Sechnaill mac Domnaill, High King (979–1002, 1014–1022)

Kingdom of Ailech (complete list) –
Domnall mac Áeda, King (887–915)
Niall Glúndub mac Áeda, King (896–919)
Flaithbertach mac Domnaill, King (916–919)
Fergal mac Domnaill, King (919–938)
Muirchertach mac Néill, King (938–943)
Domnall mac Muirchertaig ua Néill, King (943–980)
Flaithbertach mac Muirchertaig meic Néill, King (943–949)
Flaithbertach mac Conchobair, King (956–962)
Tadg mac Conchobair, King (956–962)
Conn mac Conchobair, King (956–962)
Murchad Glun re Lar mac Flaithbertaigh, King (962–972)
Fergal mac Domnaill meic Conaing, King (980–989)
Áed mac Domnaill Ua Néill, King (989–1004)

Airgíalla (complete list) –
Maol Craoibh ua Duibh Sionach, King (?–917)
Fogarthach mac Donnegan, King (?–947)
Egneach mac Dalach, King (?–961)
Donnacan mac Maelmuire, King (?–970)
Mac Eiccnigh mac Dalagh, King (?–998)
Mac Leiginn mac Cerbaill, King (?–1022)

Kingdom of Breifne (complete list) –
Flann mac Tighearnáin, Lord (c.910)
Cernachan mac Tighearnáin, King (?–931)
Conghalach mac Cathaláin, Lord (c.935)
Cléircén son of Tigernán, King (c.937)
Fergal ua Ruairc, King (?)
(Sean) Fergal Ó Ruairc, King (c.964–967)
Niall Ó Ruairc, heir (1000–1001)

Connachta (complete list) –
Cathal mac Conchobair, King (900–925)
Tadg mac Cathail, King (925–956)
Fergal Ua Ruairc, King (956–967)
Conchobar mac Tadg, King (967–973)
Cathal mac Tadg, King (973)
Cathal mac Conchobar mac Taidg, King (973–1010)

Kingdom of Dublin (complete list) –
Ímar ua Ímair, King (?–904)
Sitric Cáech, King (917–920)
Gofraid ua Ímair, King (921–934)
Olaf Guthfrithson, King (934–939)
Blácaire mac Gofraid, King (939–945, 947–948)
Amlaíb Cuarán, King (945–947)
Gofraid mac Sitriuc, King (?–951)
Glúniairn, King (?–989)
Ivar of Waterford, possible king (989–993), King (994–995)
Sigtrygg Silkbeard, King (989/995–1036)

Leinster (complete list) –
Cerball mac Muirecáin, King (885–909)
Augaire mac Aililla, King (909–917)
Faelan mac Muiredach, King (917–942)
Lorcán mac Fáelán, King (942–943)
Bran Fionn mac Máelmórda, King (943–947)
Túathal mac Úgaire, King (947–958)
Cellach mac Faelan, King (958–966)
Murchad mac Bran Fionn, King (966–972)
Úgaire mac Túathail, King (972–978)
Domnall Claen, King (978–984)
Donnchad mac Domnall Claen, King (984–1003)

Magh Luirg (complete list) –
Máel Ruanaid Mór mac Tadg, King (fl.956)
Muirchertach mac Maelruanaidh Mor, King (?)

Kingdom of Meath (complete list) –
Flann Sinna mac Maíl Sechnaill, King (877–916)
Conchobar mac Flainn, King (916–919)
Donnchad Donn mac Flainn, King (919–944)
Oengus mac Donnchada, King (944–945/946)
Donnchad mac Domnaill, King (945/946–950)
Fergal Got mac Oengussa, King (c.950)
Aed mac Mael Ruanaid, King (c.950–951)
Domnall mac Donnchada, King (951–952)
Carlus mac Cuinn, King (952–960)
Donnchad Finn mac Aeda, King (960–974)
Muirchertach mac Mael Sechnaill, King (974–c.976)
Máel Sechnaill mac Domnaill, King (975/976–1022)

Kingdom of Munster (complete list) –
Finguine Cenn nGécan mac Loégairi, King (895–902)
Cormac mac Cuilennáin, King (902–908)
Flaithbertach mac Inmainén, King (908–944)
Lorcán mac Coinlígáin, King (944–?)
Cellachán Caisil, King (?–954)
Máel Fathardaig mac Flann, King (954–957)
Dub-dá-Bairenn mac Domnaill, King (957–959)
Fer Gráid mac Clérig, King (959–961)
Donnchad mac Cellacháin, King (959–963)
Máel Muad mac Brain, King (959–970, 976–978)
Ivar of Limerick, King (960–977)
Mathgamain mac Cennétig, King (970–976)
Brian Boru, King (978–1014)

Uí Maine (complete list) –
Mughroin mac Sochlachan, King (?–904)
Sochlachan mac Diarmata, King (?–909)
Murchadh mac Sochlachan, King (?–936)
Murchadh mac Aodha, King (?–960)
Geibennach mac Aedha, King (?–973)
Muirgus mac Domnaill, King (?–986)
Tadhg Mór Ua Cellaigh, King (?–1014)

Ulaid / Ulster (complete list) –
Áed mac Eochocáin, King (898–919)
Dubgall mac Áeda, King (919–925)
Loingsech mac Cinn Etig, King (925–932)
Eochaid mac Conaill, King (932–937)
Matudán mac Áeda, King (937–950)
Ardgal mac Matudáin, King (950–970)
Niall mac Áeda, King (970–971)
Áed mac Loingsig, King (971–972)
Eochaid mac Ardgail, King (972–1004)

Europe: Central

Holy Roman Empire in Germany

See also List of state leaders in the 10th-century Holy Roman Empire

Holy Roman Empire, Kingdom of Germany (complete list, complete list) –
Louis the Child, King (899–911)
Conrad I, King (911–918)
Henry I, King (919–936)
Otto I, King (936–973), Holy Roman Emperor (962–973)
Otto II, King (961–983), Holy Roman Emperor (967–983)
Otto III, King (983–1002), Holy Roman Emperor (996–1002)

Hungary

Principality of Hungary (complete list) –
Árpád, Grand Prince (c.895–c.907)
Zoltán, Grand Prince (c.907–c.948)
Fajsz, Grand Prince (c. 948)
Taksony, Grand Prince (c.955–c.973)
Géza, Grand Prince (c.973–997)
Stephen I, Grand Prince (997–1000), King (1000–1038)

Moravia

Great Moravia (complete list) –
Mojmír II, Duke (894–906)

Poland

Civitas Schinesghe (complete list) –
Lestek, Duke (early 10th century)
Siemomysł, Duke (mid–10th century)
Mieszko I, Duke (960–992)
Bolesław I, Duke (992–1025), King (1025)

Kingdom of Poland (1025–1385) (complete list) –
Bolesław I the Brave, Duke (992–1025), King (1025)

Europe: East

Volga Bulgaria (complete list) –
Almış, Emir (895–925)
Mikail bine Cäğfär, ruler (925–943)
Äxmäd bine Cäğfär, ruler (943–950)
Abdulla bine Mikail, ruler (950–970)
Talib bine Äxmäd, ruler (970–976)
Mö'min bine Äxmäd, ruler (976–980)
Abd ar-Rahman bine Mö'min, ruler (980–1006)

Khazar Khaganate (complete list) –
Aaron I, ruler (c.900)
Menahem, ruler (early 10th-century)
Benjamin, ruler (c.920)
Aaron II, ruler (late 920s–940)
Joseph, ruler (940–965)
David of Taman, ruler (c.986–988)
Georgius Tzul, ruler (?–1016)

Kievan Rus' (complete list) –
Oleg of Novgorod, Prince (882–912)
Igor I, Prince (912–945)
Olga, Regent, Consort (945–962)
Sviatoslav I, Prince (962–972)
Yaropolk I, Prince (972–980)
Vladimir I the Great, Grand Prince (980–1015)

Novgorod (complete list) –
Oleg of Novgorod (879–912)

Europe: Nordic

Denmark

Denmark (complete list) – 
Harthacnut I, King (early–10th century)
Gorm the Old, King (c. 936–c. 958)
Harald Bluetooth, King (c.958–c.986)
Sweyn Forkbeard, King (986–1014)

Norway

Kingdom of Norway (872–1397) (complete list) –
Harald Fairhair, King (c.872–930)
Eric Bloodaxe, King (c.929–934)
Haakon I the Good, King (c.934–960)
Harald II Greycloak, King (c.961–970)
Harald Bluetooth, King (c.970–985/986)
Haakon Sigurdsson, de facto ruler (c.975–995)
Olaf Tryggvason, King (995–1000)
Sweyn Forkbeard, King (c.985–995, 1000–1014)

Sweden

Sweden: Proto-historic (complete list) –
Ring of Sweden, King (c.910–940)
Erik Ringsson, King (c.940–950)
Emund Eriksson, King (mid–10th century)
Björn Eriksson, King (late 10th century)
Olof Björnsson, King (late 10th century)

Sweden (800–1521) (complete list) –
Eric the Victorious, King (c.970–c.995)
Olof Skötkonung, King (c.995–1022)

Europe: Southcentral

Holy Roman Empire in Italy 

See also List of state leaders in the 10th-century Holy Roman Empire#Italy

Kingdom of Italy (complete list) –
Integrum: Simultaneous claimants
Berengar I, King (887–924)
Louis III the Blind, King (900–905)
Rudolph II of Burgundy, King (922–926)
Hugh of Arles, King (924–947)
Lothair II, King (948–950)
Berengar II of Ivrea, co-King (950–961)
Adalbert of Ivrea, co-King (950–963)
Ottonian dynasty
Otto I, King (961–973)
Otto II, King (980–983)
Otto III, King (996–1002)

March of Montferrat (complete list) –
William I, Marquis (?–pre-934)
Aleramo, Marquis (933–991)
William II, co-Marquis (?–pre-967)
Otto I, ruler (c.991)
William III, ruler (991–pre-1042)

Papal States (complete list) –
Benedict IV, Pope (900–903)
Leo V, Pope (903)
Sergius III, Pope (904–911)
Anastasius III, Pope (911–913)
Lando, Pope (913–914)
John X, Pope (914–928)
Leo VI, Pope (928)
Stephen VII, Pope (929–931)
John XI, Pope (931–935)
Leo VII, Pope (936–939)
Stephen VIII, Pope (939–942)
Marinus II, Pope (942–946)
Agapetus II, Pope (946–955)
John XII, Pope (955–963, 964)
Benedict V, Pope (964)
Leo VIII, Pope (964–965)
John XIII, Pope (965–972)
Benedict VI, Pope (973–974)
Benedict VII, Pope (974–983)
John XIV, Pope (983–984)
John XV, Pope (985–996)
Gregory V, Pope (996–999)
Sylvester II, Pope (999–1003)

Duchy of Spoleto (complete list) –
Alberic I, Duke (898–922)
Boniface I, Duke (923–928)
Peter, Duke (924–928)
Theobald I, Duke (928–936)
Anscar, Duke (936–940)
Sarlione, Duke (940–943)
Hubert, Duke (943–946)
Boniface II, Duke (946–953)
Theobald II, Duke (953–959)
Transamund III, Duke (c.959–c.967)
Pandulf I, Duke (967–981)
Landulf, Duke (981–982)
Transamund III, Duke (982–989)
Hugh I the Great, Duke (989–996)
Conrad, Duke (996–998)
Adhemar, Duke (998–999)

March of Tuscany (complete list) –
Adalbert II the Rich, Margrave (886–915)
Guy, Margrave (915–929)
Lambert, Margrave (929–931)
Boso, Margrave (931–936)
Humbert, Margrave (936–961)
Hugh the Great, Margrave (961–1001)

Republic of Venice (complete list) –
Pietro Tribuno, Doge (888–912)
Orso II Participazio, Doge (912–932)
Pietro II Candiano, Doge (932–939)
Pietro Participazio, Doge (939–942)
Pietro III Candiano, Doge (942–959)
Pietro IV Candiano, Doge (959–976)
Pietro I Orseolo, Doge (976–978)
Vitale Candiano, Doge (978–979)
Tribuno Memmo, Doge (979–991)
Pietro II Orseolo, Doge (991–1009)

Southern Italy

Principality of Benevento (complete list) –
Atenulf I, Prince (900–910)
Landulf I, co-ruler (901–910), Prince (910–943)
Atenulf II, co-ruler (911–940)
Landulf of Conza, co-ruler (940)
Atenulf III Carinola, co-ruler (933–943)
Landulf II, co-ruler (940–943), Prince (943–961)
Landulf III, co-ruler (959–961), Prince (961–968)
Pandulf I, co-ruler (943–961), Prince (961–981)
Landulf IV, co-ruler (968–981)
Pandulf II, Prince (981–1014)

Principality of Capua (complete list) – 
Atenulf I, Gastald (887–910)
Landulf III, Gastald (901–910), Prince (910–943)
Atenulf II, co-Prince (911–940)
Landulf of Conza, co-Prince (940)
Atenulf III Carinola, co-Prince (933–943)
Landulf IV, Prince (940–961)
Landulf III, Prince (959–968)
Pandulf I Ironhead, Prince (961–981)
Landulf VI, Prince (981–982)
Landenulf II, Prince (982–993)
Laidulf, Prince (993–999)
Adhemar, Prince (999)
Landulf VII, Prince (999–1007)

Duchy of Gaeta (complete list) – 
Docibilis I, Hypatus (866–906)
John I, Hypatus (867–933)
Docibilis II, co-Hypatus (906–933), Duke (933–954)
John II, co-Duke (933–954), Duke (954–963)
Gregory, Duke (963–978)
Marinus II, Duke (978–984)
John III, co-Duke (979–984), Duke (984–1008)
John IV, co-Duke (991–1008), Duke (1008–1012)

March of Ivrea (complete list) – 
Anscar I of Ivrea, Margrave (888–902)
Adalbert I, Margrave (902–929)
Anscar II, Margrave (929–936)
Berengar I, Margrave (936–957)
Guy, Margrave (957–965)
Adalbert II, Margrave (965–970)
Conrad, Margrave (970–c.990)
Arduin, Margrave (c.990–1015)

Duchy of Naples (complete list) – 
Gregory IV, Duke (898–915)
John II, Duke (915–919)
Marinus I, Duke (919–928)
John III, Duke (928–968/969)
Marinus II, Duke (968/969–992/997)
Sergius III, Duke (992–997/999)
John IV, Duke (997/999–1005)

Principality of Salerno (complete list) – 
Guaimar I, Prince (880–901)
Guaimar II, Prince (901–946)
Gisulf I, Prince (946–978)
Landulf of Conza, Prince in opposition (973)
Pandulf I Ironhead, Prince (978–981)
Pandulf II, Prince (981)
Manso, Prince (981–983)
John I, Prince (981–983)
John II, Prince (983–994)
Guaimar III, Prince (994–1027)

Emirate of Sicily (complete list) –
al-Hasan al-Kalbi, Emir (948–953)
Ahmad ibn al-Hasan al-Kalbi, Emir (954–969) 
Ya'ish, Emir (969-970)
Abu'l-Qasim Ali ibn al-Hasan al-Kalbi, Emir (970–982) 
Jabir al-Kalbi, Emir (982–983)
Ja'far al-Kalbi, Emir (983–985)
Abdallah al-Kalbi, Emir (985–990)
Yusuf al-Kalbi, Emir (990–998)
Ja'far al-Kalbi, Emir (998–1019)

Europe: Southwest

Iberian Peninsula: Christian

Iberian Peninsula: Christian

County of Aragon (complete list) –
Galindo Aznárez II, Count (893–922)

Kingdom of Asturias (complete list) –
Alfonso III, King (866–910)
Fruela II, King (910–925)

County of Barcelona (complete list) –
Wilfred II Borrel, Count (897–911)
Sunyer, Count (911–947)
Borrell II, Count (947–992)
Miro, Count (947–966)
Ramon Borrell, Count (988–1018)

County of Pallars (complete list) –
Raymond I, Count (872–920)
Lope I, Count (920–947)
Isarn, Count (920–948)
Raymond II, Count (948–992)
Borrell I, Count (948–995)
Ermengol I, Count (992–1010)
Suñer I, Count (995–1011)

Kingdom of Pamplona (complete list) –
Fortún Garcés, King (882–905)
Sancho I, King (905–925)
Jimeno Garcés, King (925–931)
García Sánchez I, King (931–970)
Sancho II, King (970–994)
García Sánchez II, King (994–1000/1004)

County of Ribagorza (complete list) –
Raymond I, Count (872–920)
Bernard I, Count (920–950/955)
Miro, Count (920–?)
Raymond II, Count (950/955–970)
Humfred (II), Count (970–979)
Arnold, Count (979–990)
Isarn, Count (990–1003)

Iberian Peninsula: Muslim

Iberian Peninsula: Muslim

Emirate of Córdoba (complete list) –
Abdallah ibn Muhammad, Emir (888–912)
Abd ar-Rahman III, Emir (912–929), Caliph (929–961)
Al-Hakam II, Caliph (961–976)
Hisham II, Caliph (976–1008, 1010–1012)

Marca Hispanica

Marca Hispanica

County of Osona (complete list) –
Ermengol, Count (939–943)

County of Cerdanya (complete list) –
Miró II, Count (897–927)
Sunifred II, Count (927–968)
Miró III, Count (968–984)
Oliba Cabreta, Count (968–988)
Wilfred II, Count (988–1035)

County of Urgell (complete list) –
Sunifred II, Count (898–948)
Miró de Barcelona, Count (948–966)
Borrell II, Count (966–992)
Ermengol I of Córdoba, Count (992–1010)

Europe: West

West Frankish Kingdom, later France (complete list) –
Charles the Simple, King (898–922)
Robert I, King (922–923)
Rudolph, King (923–936)
Louis IV, King (936–954)
Lothair, King (954–986)
Louis V, King (986–987)
Hugh Capet, King (987–996)
Robert II, King (987–1031)

County of Angoulême (complete list) –
Alduin I, Count (886–916)
Aymer of Poitiers, Count (916–926)
William II ("Taillefer" I), Count (926–c.945)
Aymer II, Count (after 945–before 952)
Bernard, Count (after 945–before 952)
Arnald I "Voratio", Count (after 950–before 952)
William III "Talleyrand", Count (952/964–before 973/975)
Rannulf "Bompar", Count (973/975–975)
Richard the Simple, Count (975?)
Arnald II "Manzer", Count (975–988)
William IV (Taillefer II), Count (988–1028)

Anjou (complete list) –
Fulk I, Count (898–942)
Fulk II, Count (942–958)
Geoffrey I, Count (960–987)
Fulk III, Count (987–1040)

Duchy of Aquitaine (complete list) –
William I, Duke (893–918)
William II, Duke (918–926)
Acfred, Duke (926–927)
Ebalus, Duke (890–893, 927–932)
Raymond I, Duke (932–936)
Raymond II, Duke (936–955)
Hugh the Great, Duke (955–962)
William III, Duke (962–963)
William IV, Duke (963–995)
William V, Duke (995–1030)

County of Artois (complete list) –
Adelelm, Count (?–932)

Auvergne (complete list) –
William I, Duke of Aquitaine, Count (886–918)
William II, Duke of Aquitaine, Count (858–862, 918–926)
Acfred, Duke of Aquitaine, Count (926–927)
Ebalus Manzer, Count (927–934)
Raymond Pons, Count of Toulouse, Count (940–941)
William III, Duke of Aquitaine, Count (950–963)
Armand of Clermont, Count (late 10th century)
Robert I of Clermont, Count (late 10th century)
Robert II of Clermont, Count (late 10th century)
Robert III of Clermont, Count (late 10th century)
Guy I of Auvergne, Count (979–989)
William IV of Auvergne, Count (989–1016)

County of Boulogne (complete list) –
Baldwin I, Count (896–918)
Adelolf, Count (918–933)
Arnulf I, Count (933–964)
Arnulf II, Count (964–971)
Arnulf III, Count (971–990)
Baldwin II, Count (990–1025)

Bourbonnais (complete list) –
, Lord (915–953)
, Lord (953–959)
, Lord (959–990)
, Lord (990–1031/34)

Duchy of Brittany (complete list) –
Alan I, King (876–907)
Gourmaëlon, ruler (907–c.914)
Hroflr, Viking ruler (early 10th century)
Rognvaldr, Viking ruler (early 10th century)
Incon, Viking ruler (early 10th century)
Alan II, Duke (938–952)
Drogo, Duke (952–958) 
Hoël I, Duke (960–981)
Guerech, Duke (981–988)
Conan I, Duke (990–992))
Geoffrey I, Duke (992–1008)

Duchy of Burgundy (complete list) –
Richard the Justiciar, Duke (880–921)
Rudolph, Duke (921–923)
Hugh the Black, Duke (923–952)
Gilbert, Duke (952–956)
Otto, Duke (956–965)
Eudes Henry, Duke (965–1002)

County of Flanders (complete list) –
Baldwin II, Count (879–918)
Arnulf I the Great, Count (918–964)
Baldwin III, Count (958–962)
Arnulf II, Count (964–988)
Baldwin IV the Bearded, Count (988–1037)

Duchy of Gascony (complete list) –
García II, Duke (893–c.930)
Sans IV, Duke (930–c.950)
Sans V, Duke (c.950–c.961)
Guilhem II, Duke (c.961–996)
Bernat I, Duke (996–1009)

County of Maine (complete list) –
Hugh I, Count (900–950)
Hugh II, Count (950–992)
Hugh III, Count (992–1015)

County of Nevers (complete list) –
Otto-Henry, Count (?–987)
Otto-William, Count (987–992)
Landri, Count (992–1028)

Duchy of Normandy (complete list) –
Rollo, Count (911–927)
William Longsword, Count (927–942)
Richard I the Fearless, Count (942–996)
Richard II the Good, Duke (996–1027)

County of Poitou (complete list) –
Robert I, Count (866–923)
Aymar, Count (892–902)
Ebalus, Count (890–893, 902–935)
William I, Count (935–963)
William II, Count (963–995)
William III, Count (969–1030)

Provence / Lower Burgundy (complete list) –
Louis the Blind, King(887–928)
Hugh, King(911–933)
Rotbold I, Count (961–1008)

County of Toulouse (complete list) –
Odo, Count (886–918)
Raymond II, Count (918–924)
Raymond III Pons, Count (924–c.950)
Raymond (IV), Count (c.950–c.961)
Hugh, Count (c.961–c.972)
Raymond (V), Count (c.972–c.978)
William III Taillefer, Count (978–1037)

County of Vermandois (complete list) –
Herbert I, Count (896–907)
Herbert II, Count (907–943)
Albert I the Pious, Count (943–988)
Herbert III, Count (987–997)
Albert II, Count (997–1035)

Eurasia: Caucasus

Kingdom of Abkhazia (complete list) –
Constantine III, King (c.898–916)
George II, King (c.916–960)
Leon III, King (c.960–969)
Demetrius III, King (c.969–976)
Theodosius III, King (c.976–978)
Bagrat III, King (978–1014)

Bagratid Armenia (complete list) –
Smbat I, King (890–912)
Ashot II, King (914–928)
Abas I, King (928–952)
Ashot III, King (952–977)
Smbat II, King (977–989)
Gagik I, King (989–1020)

Principality of Iberia (complete list) –
Adarnase IV, King (888–923)
David II, King (923–937)
Sumbat I, King (937–958)
Bagrat II, King (958–994)
Gurgen of Georgia, King (994–1008)

First Kingdom of Kakheti (complete list) –
Kvirike I, Prince (893–918)
Padla II, Prince (918–929)
Kvirike II, Prince (929–976)
David, Prince (976–1010)

Kingdom of Hereti (complete list) –
Adarnase II, King (897–943)
Ishchanik, King (943–951)
Iany I, King (951–959)

Kingdom of the Iberians (complete list) –
Adarnase IV, King (888–923)
David II, King (923–937)
Sumbat I, King (937–958)
Bagrat I, King (958–994)
Gurgen, King (994–1008)

Klarjeti (complete list) –
David I, King (900–943)
Sumbat II, King (943–988)
David II, King (988–992/993)
Sumbat III, King (992/993–1011)

Oceania

Easter Island

Easter Island (complete list) –
Uremata, King (?)
Te Riri Tuu Kura, King (?)
Korua Rongo, King (?)
Tiki Te Hatu, King (?)
Tiki Tena, King (?)
Uru Kenu, King (c.1000)

Tonga

Tuʻi Tonga Empire (complete list) –
'Aho'eitu, King (c. 950)
Lolofakangalo, King (?)
Fangaʻoneʻone, King (?)

See also
 List of political entities in the 10th century
 List of state leaders in the 10th-century Holy Roman Empire

References

10th century
 
-